Vanda xichangensis is a species of epiphytic orchid native to China South-Central.

Description
The morphology closely resembles Vanda falcata, however the spur is shorter.

Taxonomy
It differs in the spur length from Vanda falcata, however the differing length has been criticised as being insufficient to justify this species status as separate from Vanda falcata. Therefore, some authors dispute this species status and regard it as a subspecies of Vanda falcata.

Conservation
Like all orchids, it is protected unter the CITES appendix II regulations of international trade.

References

xichangensis
Orchids of China
Flora of China
Endemic flora of China
Epiphytic orchids